The Second government of Karl Renner was a short-lived Austrian provisional government, formed shortly after World War I. It was sworn in on 15 March 1919. It succeeded the First Renner government, which had resigned on 3 March 1919, but had continued at the request of the State Council until the election. It was replaced with the Third Renner government.

Composition
Some of the members were carryover from the First Renner government, and some continued into the Third Renner government.

References

External links 
 Federal Chancellery of Austria: Government

Politics of Austria
1919 establishments in Austria
Renner II
1910s in Austria
1919 disestablishments in Austria